Thomas Hughes (born 28 October 2000) is an English professional footballer who last played as a midfielder for Ipswich Town.

Club career
He made his debut for the club on 8 October 2019 coming on as a substitute in a 4–0 win over Gillingham in the EFL Trophy. He made 3 substitute appearances in both the EFL Trophy and FA Cup during the season. On 12 June 2020 it was announced that Hughes would sign his first professional contract with Ipswich on 1 July 2020, signing a one-year deal with the option of a further year extension. Hughes left the club in January 2023 at the end of his contract.

Career statistics

References

External links

2000 births
Living people
English footballers
Association football midfielders
Ipswich Town F.C. players